Král ulice is a 1935 Czechoslovak romantic drama film, directed by Miroslav Cikán. It stars   Karel Hašler, Markéta Krausová, and Helena Bušová.

Cast
Karel Hašler as Martin Antoni
Markéta Krausová as Martin's wife
Helena Bušová as Martin's daughter Helena
Jára Kohout as Jura
Oldrich Vykypel as Jan Pokorný, violinist
Sylva Langova as Nanynka, Pokorný's sister
Milada Smolíková as Márinka Heinrichová, housewife by Martin
Bedřich Vrbský as the Police inspector
Zdenek Gina Hasler as Robert Stanley

References

External links
Král ulice at the Internet Movie Database

1935 films
Czechoslovak romantic drama films
1935 romantic drama films
Films directed by Miroslav Cikán
Czech romantic drama films
Czechoslovak black-and-white films
1930s Czech films